Club Drive is a racing video game developed and published by Atari Corporation exclusively for the Atari Jaguar on November 28, 1994, and later in Japan by Mumin Corporation on March 24, 1995.

The game is set in the titular amusement park of the same name in the year 2098, where driving became legalized after being deemed illegal for safety reasons years prior due to the invention of indestructible vehicles, which allowed the ban to be lifted. Being one of the first titles announced for the Jaguar before it was officially launched to the public in November 1993, Club Drive was developed by most of the same personnel at Atari Corp. who worked on Alien vs Predator by Rebellion Developments, which was released a month prior.

Club Drive received mixed to negative reception when it was released. As of April 1, 1995, the game has sold nearly 14.000 copies though it is unknown how many were sold in total during its lifetime.

Gameplay 

Club Drive is a semi-open three-dimensional racing game set in a futuristic theme park consisting of four different race tracks that vary in shape and thematic to race across depending on the selected game mode, featuring flat-shaded polygonal environments with very minimal texture mapping, with a hidden fifth track that is only unlocked by entering a cheat code. Players can choose between any of the three main game modes available for either one or two players, each one with their own ruleset that can be modified and any of the six colors for their car at the main menu screen, while other gameplay settings are available on the options screen. High-scores, records and setting changes by the players are kept on the cartridge's internal EEPROM.

There are multiple game modes to choose from for either one or two players: Collect is a mode which involves players capturing power balls that are randomly scattered on the playfield. Racing, as the name implies, is a race mode where players must finish a number of laps on the tracks that players are on. Tag, as the name also implies, is a playground-style mode where players are chasing each other in an attempt to "tag" or touch the rival before the time expires in order to win. Each of the selectable tracks across the three game modes also have secret passageways that teleport the player into bizarre locations.

During gameplay, players can choose between six different camera views by pressing their respective number on the keypad, while pressing either * or # changes the music. A unique feature of the game is the ability to rewind at one point in time on the track by pressing Option, allowing players to undo their mistakes or exit from the hidden areas of the track.

Synopsis 
More than 50 years ago, driving was outlawed for safety concerns and became illegal to do so until Dr. Lawrence Phosphorus, who through his research involving safety and smart materials, created fail-safe mathematic algorithms that could be applied in the creation of indestructible driving vehicles and as a result, the ban was lifted in the year 2098 and the Club Drive theme park was inaugurated to the public after driving activities were once again legalized.

Development and release 
Club Drive was one of the first titles to be announced for the then-upcoming Atari Jaguar and it was developed by most of the same Atari personnel that were previously involved with Rebellion's Alien vs Predator for the Jaguar, which was released a month prior. The game was first showcased in a playable state at SCES '94. A 1993 promotional recording sent by Atari to video game retail stores features the game in a much earlier state. GamePro magazine and other video game dedicated outlets reported that Club Drive would feature multiplayer support via the Jaguar Voice Modem by Phylon, Inc. However, the JVM itself was never completed or released, thus the game was released with the online support omitted, though the feature was available to play during focus group sessions hosted at Viveros and Associates Inc. prior to release in September 1994. The game also runs at a 640x480 resolution. During a presentation at the London Planetarium, the game was showcased to the video game press and the audience laughed to the point that then-Atari UK marketing manager Darryl Still was infuriated due to the reaction from attendees. B.J. West, who is more well known for the unreleased Atari Jaguar CD title Black ICE\White Noise and his work as a graphic artist in The Sims, worked as an artist for the dashboard of the cars.

Club Drive was released in November 1994 for Atari's Christmas campaign, alongside Doom, Checkered Flag, and Dragon: The Bruce Lee Story. It was also released in Japan by Mumin Corporation on March 24, 1995, where it came bundled with an exclusive Japanese manual for the region. The game was included as part of the Atari 50: The Anniversary Celebration compilation for Nintendo Switch, PlayStation 4, Steam, and Xbox One, marking its first re-release.

Reception 

Quick-Draw McGraw of GamePro described the game as "unusual experience" compared to other contemporary racing simulators, but criticized it for repetitive gameplay and "unfulfilled potential". Digital Press gave a 5 out of 10 score, criticizing the graphics but having mixed opinions on the gameplay. ST-Computer gave it 60%, criticizing the visuals but stated that playing the game is still fun. Three reviewers in GameFan gave scores of 69, 60, and 64, with high scores for originality but low scores for music. Brazilian magazine SuperGamePower gave the game 3.5 out of 5. Next Generation was outright critical as they rated the game with only one star. They criticized it for its many flaws and described it as to be "avoided at all costs".

Legacy 
In 1996, the game's trademark was abandoned.

A spiritual sequel to the game, titled Automaniacs, was in development by Visual Dimensions 3D for the Jaguar and was originally announced by members of the development team at JagFest '97, a small festival dedicated to the system in Chicago in August 1997, but it was never released for unknown reasons.

In 1997 Electronic Gaming Monthly ranked it number 6 on their "Top 10 Worst Games of All Time". Electronic Gaming Monthlys Seanbaby placed it as number 2 in his "20 worst games of all time" feature.

The current speedrun record of the game is 10:05 minutes, which was established by video gamer PeteDorr at SGDQ (Summer Games Done Quick) in June 2018.

References

External links 
 Club Drive at AtariAge
 Club Drive at GameFAQs
 Club Drive at MobyGames

1994 video games
Atari games
Atari Jaguar games
Atari Jaguar-only games
Commercial video games with freely available source code
Multiplayer and single-player video games
Racing video games
Split-screen multiplayer games
Video games developed in the United States
Video games set in amusement parks
Video games set in San Francisco
Video games set in the 2090s
Video games set on fictional planets
Video games with time manipulation